Stefan Jovanović (born 1989) is a Serbian politician who has been a member of the National Assembly since 1 August 2022. He is a spokesperson and secretary general of the centre-right People's Party (Narodna stranka, NS).

Biography 
Jovanović was born in 1989 in Niš, SR Serbia, SFR Yugoslavia. He graduated at the Faculty of Law at the University of Niš. As a result of his engagement in the field of student rights protection, in 2014 he was unanimously elected as the first student ombudsman of the student parliament of the University of Niš.

After graduation, he started working as an advisor in the field of legal issues and administration at the Center for International Cooperation and Sustainable Development, whose president is Vuk Jeremić.

He was part of Jeremić's team during his candidature for the position of the secretary-general of the United Nations.

He is the manager of the "Mihailo Miško Jeremić" Foundation, which was founded by Vuk Jeremić.

Political career 
In October 2017, at the founding assembly of the People's Party, he was elected secretary general of the party. In January 2021, he was elected spokesperson of the party.

In the 2022 general election, the People's Party contested as part of the United for the Victory of Serbia alliance and Jovanović was elected MP. Following the constitution of the National Assembly, Jovanović was named the deputy head of the People's Party parliamentary group.

References 

1989 births
Living people
Politicians from Niš
University of Niš alumni
People's Party (Serbia, 2017) politicians
Members of the National Assembly (Serbia)